Kjell Ulrichsen (born 18 November 1944) is a former Norwegian curler.

He is a champion of the first-ever European Curling Championships, played  and a three-time Norwegian men's curling champion.

Teams

References

External links
 

Living people
1944 births
Norwegian male curlers
European curling champions
Norwegian curling champions
20th-century Norwegian people